The Korean National Sports Festival is an annual sports competition held in South Korea.

For a full week each October, about 20,000 athletes representing 16 cities and provinces throughout the country compete in about 40 separate sports. The site rotates among the major cities, including Seoul, Busan, Daegu, Gwangju and Incheon. The 2005 festival was held in Ulsan and the 2009 festival in Daejeon.

Competitions are held in High School, College, and Regular Divisions.

History
The current annual numbering originates from the 1920 All-Korea Baseball Series and the formation of the Korean Sports Festival (조선체육회). The Japanese colonial government held a multi-sport competition in 1925, but the Korean Sports Festival first became a national multi-sport competition in 1934, with baseball, soccer, tennis, track and field, and basketball.

In 1938, the Korean Sports Festival was forcibly dissolved by the colonial government. The festival, numbered 26th, resumed upon the 1945 liberation of Korea. With the establishment of South Korea in 1948, the event was renamed the "National Sports Festival," and individual competition was changed to competition among cities and provinces. The festival was cancelled in 1951, during the Korean War.

List of Korean National Sports Festivals

Other national sports events
Related annual national sports events include:
 The Children's National Sports Festival
 The National Winter Sports Festival
 The National Sports Festival for the Handicapped

References

External links
 Ministry of Culture & Tourism
 Summary of Previous Festivals (in Korean)
 History of the Festival (in Korean)

1920 establishments in Korea
Multi-sport events in South Korea
National multi-sport events
Recurring sporting events established in 1920
Annual events in South Korea
Sports festivals in South Korea
Autumn events in South Korea